Robin Atkin Downes is an English actor known for his work in animation and video games.

Early life
Downes was born in London. He earned an MFA from Temple University in Philadelphia.

Career 
Downes has voiced characters in animated films such as Ack in How to Train Your Dragon, David in the English dub of Steamboy, and Manchester Black in Superman vs. The Elite. His live-action television roles include Pockla in Angel, Byron and Morann Babylon 5, and Machida in Buffy the Vampire Slayer, while his voice work on television includes The Master on The Strain and various roles on Regular Show, Star Wars: The Clone Wars, The Avengers: Earth's Mightiest Heroes, and ThunderCats.

Downes' video game roles include various characters in Gears of War and Metal Gear, Travis Touchdown in No More Heroes, Captain Slag in Ratchet & Clank, a selectable voice for the male protagonist in Saints Row: The Third, the Medic in Team Fortress 2, Spider in Destiny 2: Forsaken, the Prophet of Regret in Halo 2, Brynjolf in Skyrim, Robert in The Last of Us, Captain Conrad Roth in Tomb Raider, various characters across the Uncharted franchise, The Prince in Prince of Persia: Warrior Within, and Cyclops and Pyro in X-Men Legends.

Downes maintains a personal YouTube channel, on which he uploads behind-the-scenes footage of his work over the years.

In July 2021, Downes voiced Cham Syndulla in Star Wars: The Bad Batch. Downes had previously voiced the character in Star Wars: The Clone Wars and Star Wars Rebels.

Personal life 
Downes married American actress Michael Ann Young on 6 November 2004. They live in Los Angeles and have a daughter named Natasha.

Filmography

Voice acting

Feature films

Direct-to-video and television films

Television shows

Animation

Video games

Live-action acting

Films

Television

References

External links 

 
 
 

Living people
English expatriates in the United States
English male film actors
English male stage actors
English male television actors
English male video game actors
English male voice actors
Male actors from London
Year of birth missing (living people)